Oxbow Park may refer to:

Oxbow Park (Seattle), a public park in Seattle
Oxbow Park and Zollman Zoo, a campground and zoo in Olmsted County, Minnesota
Oxbow Regional Park, a nature preserve in Oregon